Germain Sengelin (8 August 1937 – 9 October 2021) was a French judge who worked in Mulhouse in France. He worked on organized crime related affairs, and was a judge in the Air France Flight 296 accident.

Sources 

Fabrizio Calvi, L'Europe des parrains : La Mafia à l'assaut de l'Europe

1937 births
2021 deaths
20th-century French judges
People from Mulhouse
Place of birth missing